Sherrard Clemens (April 28, 1820 – June 30, 1881) was a nineteenth-century politician and lawyer from Virginia and Missouri. He was a cousin to author Samuel L. Clemens (a.k.a. Mark Twain). The unincorporated community of Sherrard in Marshall County, West Virginia is named after him.

Biography
Born in Wheeling, Virginia (now West Virginia), Clemens was appointed a cadet to the United States Military Academy in West Point, New York, but resigned after six months. He graduated from Washington College in Washington, Pennsylvania and was admitted to the bar in 1843, commencing practice in Wheeling. He was elected a Democrat to the United States House of Representatives to fill a vacancy in 1852, serving until 1853. Clemens was later elected back to the House in 1856, serving again from 1857 to 1861.

He was not favorably impressed by Abraham Lincoln, whom he called "a cross between a sandhill crane and an Andalusian jackass."   "He is vain, weak, puerile, hypocritical, without manners, without moral grace, and as he talks with you he punches you under your ribs."  Clemens also wrote, "He is surrounded by a set of toad eaters and bottle holders."  During the Civil War, he opposed secession. He was a member of the Virginia Convention in 1861 and afterwards resumed practicing law in Wheeling. He attended the First Wheeling Convention from May 13–15, 1861, but actively opposed the partitioning of Virginia into two states. Clemens later moved to St. Louis, Missouri, and resumed practicing law until his death there on June 30, 1881. He was interred in Calvary Cemetery in St. Louis. Mark Twain wrote of his cousin that at the time of the war he himself had been a "warm rebel" and Sherrard Clemans a Republican, but later he had temporary became a Republican and Sherrard Clemens a "warm rebel".

Clemens fought a duel with O. Jennings Wise, the son of Virginia Governor Henry A. Wise. Wise was uninjured in the duel, but Clemens received a severe injury to his right testicle.

See also
 West Virginia in the Civil War

References

External links

 

1820 births
1881 deaths
Virginia lawyers
United States Military Academy alumni
Washington & Jefferson College alumni
People of West Virginia in the American Civil War
Politicians from Wheeling, West Virginia
Politicians from St. Louis
American duellists
Virginia Secession Delegates of 1861
Democratic Party members of the United States House of Representatives from Virginia
19th-century American politicians
Lawyers from Wheeling, West Virginia
19th-century American lawyers